Pelican Place at Craft Farms is a  lifestyle center in Gulf Shores, Alabama. It was designed by CMH Architects of Birmingham, the firm that also designed the Eastern Shore Centre in nearby Spanish Fort. It was developed by Colonial Properties as part of their "Pinnacle" brand of lifestyle centers and was originally known as the Pinnacle at Craft Farms. In September 2015, Langley Properties, the development's most recent management company, sold Pelican Place to RCG Ventures of Atlanta, Georgia, for more than $18 million.

Pelican Place has three anchors.  These include a  fourteen screen Cobb Theatres multiplex, a  Books A Million, and  Bed Bath & Beyond. A 90-room Courtyard by Marriott hotel, and a  Publix supermarket are immediately south of Pelican Place.  The main in-line tenant buildings of the shopping center are oriented along a linear street-scape, which is then intersected to the east by a pedestrian oriented restaurant plaza and splash fountain.  Pelican Place was developed as a retail and entertainment component of the Craft Farms golf community, from which it is separated via a landscaped man-made retention pond. It is the primary retail component of the  master-planned community.

See also 
 Bel Air Mall
 Cordova Mall
 Eastern Shore Centre

References

Shopping malls in Alabama
Shopping malls established in 2008
Buildings and structures in Baldwin County, Alabama
Tourist attractions in Baldwin County, Alabama